Aloysius Andrew Hauk (December 29, 1912 – November 9, 2004) was a United States district judge of the United States District Court for the Central District of California.

Education and career

Born in Denver, Colorado, Hauk received an Artium Baccalaureus degree from Regis College, later renamed Regis University, in 1935, a Bachelor of Laws from Columbus School of Law at Catholic University of America in 1938, and a Doctor of Juridical Science from Yale Law School in 1942. He was a special assistant to the United States Attorney General's Office for the Antitrust Division from 1939 to 1941. He was an Assistant United States Attorney for the Southern District of California from 1941 to 1942. He was a Lieutenant in the United States Naval Reserve working in Naval Intelligence during World War II, from 1942 to 1946. He was in private practice in Los Angeles, California from 1946 to 1964, which included work as assistant counsel to Union Oil Company in Los Angeles from 1952 to 1964. He was a judge of the Superior Court of Los Angeles County from 1964 to 1966.

Federal judicial service

On June 13, 1966, Hauk was nominated by President Lyndon B. Johnson to a seat on the United States District Court for the Southern District of California vacated by Judge William Matthew Byrne Sr. Hauk was confirmed by the United States Senate on June 29, 1966, and received his commission the same day. On September 18, 1966, Hauk was reassigned by operation of law to the newly created United States District Court for the Central District of California, to a new seat established by 80 Stat. 75. Hauk served as Chief Judge from 1980 to 1982 and assumed senior status on September 29, 1982. He served in that capacity until his death on November 9, 2004, in Pasadena, California.

References

Sources

External links
 Obit from the Los Angeles Times

1912 births
2004 deaths
Lawyers from Denver
Military personnel from Colorado
California state court judges
Judges of the United States District Court for the Southern District of California
Judges of the United States District Court for the Central District of California
United States district court judges appointed by Lyndon B. Johnson
20th-century American judges
Regis University alumni
Yale Law School alumni
Columbus School of Law alumni
United States Navy officers
Assistant United States Attorneys